Cuvieria is a genus of hydrozoans belonging to the family Dipleurosomatidae.

Species:

Cuvieria carisochroma 
Cuvieria huxleyi

References

Dipleurosomatidae
Hydrozoan genera